{{Infobox album
| name       = Kenny Burrell & John Coltrane
| type       = studio
| artist     = Kenny Burrell & John Coltrane
| cover      = Kenny Burrell and John Coltrane.jpeg
| alt        =
| released   = 
| recorded   = March 7, 1958
| venue      =
| studio     = Van Gelder (Hackensack)
| genre      = Jazz
| length     = 37:20
| label      = New JazzNJ 8276
| producer   = Bob Weinstock
| prev_title = Ballads
| prev_year  = 1963
| next_title = Impressions
| next_year  = 1963
| misc       = {{Extra album cover
 | header  = Alternative cover
 | type    = Album
 | cover   = Burrell_Quintet_With_John_Coltrane.jpg
 | border  =
 | alt     =
 | caption = The Kenny Burrell Quintet With John Coltrane (PR 7532, 1968)}}
}}Kenny Burrell & John Coltrane is a studio album of music performed by jazz musicians Kenny Burrell and John Coltrane. It was released on the New Jazz label in April 1963. The recording was made on March 7, 1958. It was reissued in 1967 on New Jazz's parent label Prestige, with a different cover and retitled The Kenny Burrell Quintet With John Coltrane.

Reception

Lindsay Planer of AllMusic gave it 4 stars, stating: "While not one of Coltrane's most assured performances, he chases the groove right into the hands of Burrell. The guitarist spins sonic gold and seems to inspire similar contributions from Chambers' bowed bass and Coltrane alike."

Track listing
 "Freight Trane" (Tommy Flanagan) – 7:18
 "I Never Knew" (Ted Fio Rito, Gus Kahn) – 7:04
 "Lyresto" (Kenny Burrell) – 5:41
 "Why Was I Born?" (Oscar Hammerstein II, Jerome Kern) – 3:12
 "Big Paul" (Tommy Flanagan) – 14:05

Personnel
 Kenny Burrell – guitar
 John Coltrane – tenor saxophone
 Tommy Flanagan – piano
 Paul Chambers – bass
 Jimmy Cobb – drums

References

1963 albums
John Coltrane albums
Kenny Burrell albums
New Jazz Records albums
Albums recorded at Van Gelder Studio